Film Heritage Foundation is a non-profit organization, based in Mumbai, India, dedicated to film preservation, restoration and archiving of India’s film heritage.

History
The Film Heritage Foundation was founded in 2014 by Shivendra Singh Dungarpur.

Recognizing the urgent need to preserve India’s cinematic heritage, the foundation is dedicated to supporting the conservation, preservation and restoration of the moving image and to develop interdisciplinary educational programs that will use film as an educational tool and create awareness about the language of cinema.

Film Heritage Foundation was accepted as an associate member of the International Federation of Film Archives (FIAF) by the Executive Committee at the General Assembly held in Sydney in April 2015. The founder director Shivendra Singh Dungarpur has been elected as a member of the Executive Committee of FIAF.

Film Heritage Foundation’s activities cover the entire gamut of film preservation including the conservation and archiving of films and film-related memorabilia, film restoration, training and education, film curation, public outreach and advocacy. Amongst the core activities of Film Heritage Foundation is the preservation of celluloid and digital films as well as film-related memorabilia.

The foundation's aim is to preserve both films as well as film-related memorabili. In 2015, the foundation raised funds for their film preservation and restoration workshop as well as from private businesses and Bollywood actors.

The foundation also runs education and training programmes and regularly holds workshops on film conservation and preservation and restoration around the country.  In 2019, the foundation received the memorabilia of the Indian actor Raj Kapoor for preservation. The foundation initiated an oral history project in 2018, in which it interviewed at length, for a permanent historical and cultural record, some of the most eminent film personalities of India, including  Adoor Gopalakrishnan, Buddhadeb Dasgupta, Mani Ratnam, Amitabh Bachchan, Soumitra Chatterjee, Goutam Ghose and Aparna Sen. The foundation in the past has been supported by Tata Trusts with a three-year grant in 2017 to provide scholarships for participants at their annual film preservation and restoration workshops.

In 2015, Martin Scorsese’s The Film Foundation lent their support for Film Heritage Foundation’s first film preservation and restoration workshop in Mumbai. The foundation was accepted as an associate member of the International Federation of Film Archives (FIAF) at the General Assembly held in Sydney in April 2015 and Shivendra Singh Dungarpur was elected for a second term as a member of the Executive Committee of FIAF at the FIAF Congress in Lausanne in 2019.

Preservation and archiving
Film collection
The foundation currently has around 500 titles (approx. 7500 film reels) on 35 mm, 16 mm, Super 8 and 8 mm formats from the earliest days of cinema and from all regions. Besides feature films, the collections include important historical footage dating from the 1930s and ‘40s including footage of the  freedom  movement  and  rare  home  movies  of  the  pre-Independence   era  that  are  preserved  in  a temperature-controlled storage facility as well as films of leading film personalities like Amitabh Bachchan, Shyam Benegal, Mani Ratnam, Vishal Bhardwaj, Kumar Shahani, Farhan and Zoya Akhtar, Govind Nihalani, N.N. Sippy, Buddhadeb Dasgupta, Goutam Ghose, Bhimsain Khurana, Chitra Palekar, Onir, Shaad Ali, Sumitra Bhave and Sunil Sukhthankar.

Archive of film-related memorabilia
The foundation also archive film-related memorabilia like posters, photographs, scripts, lobby cards, song booklets and artefacts of eminent film personalities.

The foundation has a rapidly expanding archive of film-related memorabilia that includes posters, photographs, scripts, lobby cards, song booklets, cameras, projectors and artefacts of eminent film personalities like A.R. Kardar, Sohrab Modi, Raj Kapoor, Kidar Sharma, Saeed Mirza, Shyam Benegal, G. Aravindan, V.K. Murthy, Sahir Ludhianvi, Sadhana, JBH Wadia, Buddhadeb Dasgupta, Girish Kasaravalli, Film News Anandan, Goutam Ghose, Govind Nihalani, Jamuna J, Kundan Shah, Aruna Raje, Ashim Ahluwalia, Pran and many others from all the regional film industries.

The collection comprises over 30,000 photographs, 10,000 photo negatives, 15,000 posters, 10,000 lobby cards, 15,000 newspaper articles, 5000 lobby cards, 6000 song booklets and numerous 3-D objects.

Oral History Programme
Film Heritage Foundation (FHF) has partnered with the Academy of Motion Picture Arts and Sciences (AMPAS) known for the Oscars, for a pioneering visual history program following international practices of oral history for film heritage in India. The mission is to record, collect and preserve audio and video interviews with the men and women who form the rich fabric of filmmaking history - from designers, documentarians and executives to actors, animators, technicians and composers.

Film Restoration

Kumatty
The FHF collaborated with the Cineteca di Bologna, The Film Foundation's World Cinema Project, and renowned Indian director Aravindan Govindan to restore the timeless Malayalam film "Kummatty" (1979). One of Japan's top film reviewers and scholars, Tadao Sato, called "Kummatty" a masterpiece and said he had never seen a more beautiful movie in his entire life. Not only is Aravindan a master, but all of his original camera negatives have been lost, leaving only prints that aren't in the best of shape. As a result, his films have been at the top of our list for restoration.

Shivendra Singh Dungarpur travelled to Kollam, Kerala, in February 2020 to see the movie's producer, Mr. K. Ravindranathan Nair of General Pictures, who graciously agreed to grant authorization for the restoration and allow us access to the prints from the National Film Archive of India (NFAI). The prints at the NFAI were examined by an FHF film conservator, who discovered that they weren't in terrific shape. Since the prints were the best elements we could discover, they were sent to the L'Immagine Ritrovata lab in Bologna.

The lack of an original sound negative and the lab's use of the less-than-ideal sound from the print complicated the restoration process for "Kummatty" in this case. We digitised roughly 15 of Ramu Aravindan's father's quarter-inch recordings with his assistance in the hopes of finding better sources, but there were none. The sound experts at the lab were forced to spend numerous hours cleaning up and remastering the sound as a result.

Training programmes
The foundation has been conducting week-long annual film preservation and restoration workshops in collaboration with the International Federation of Film Archives (FIAF) around the country since 2015 for creating awareness in major film centres.

Film Heritage Foundation held the first in the series of short workshops in association with the International Federation  of Film  Archives  (FIAF)  and in collaboration  with  Nehru  Science  Centre  (National  Council  of Science  Museums,  Ministry  of  Culture,  Govt.  of  India)  –  “Film  Preservation  in  Practice”  –  a  two-day workshop with David Walsh and Mick Newnham on March 9 and 10, 2018. In March 2019, Film Heritage Foundation in association with FIAF and the Nepal Film Development Board conducted a workshop in Kathmandu to save Nepal’s Audiovisual Heritage.

Film Heritage Foundation organized Reframing the Future of Film an event headlined by visual artist Tacita Dean and film director Christopher Nolan in 2018 in Mumbai.

Film Heritage Foundation in collaboration with the Goethe-Institut / Max Mueller Bhavan Mumbai conducted a 2-day Workshop for the Preservation of Audio and Videotapes in 2020. Andreas Weisser, a conservation expert from Germany was invited to conduct sessions on how to preserve audio and video tapes.

FPRWI 2022
Film Heritage Foundation and FIAF conducted the 7th edition of the Film Preservation & Restoration Workshop India 2022 (FPRWI 2022) – in-person and hands-on from December 4 – 10, 2022 at the CSMVS Museum, Mumbai.

The Film Preservation & Restoration Workshop India 2022 (FPRWI 2022) was an initiative of Film Heritage Foundation and the International Federation of Film Archives (FIAF) in collaboration with the Chhatrapati Shivaji Maharaj Vastu Sangrahalaya (CSMVS Museum) and in association with The Film Foundation’s World Cinema Project, L’Immagine Ritrovata, British Film Institute, Cinemateca Portuguesa, Bundesarchiv (German Federal Archives), Institut National de L’Audiovisuel, The Metropolitan Museum of Art, Academy Museum of Motion Pictures, Cinémathèque Suisse, Fondation Jérôme Seydoux – Pathé, The Media Archive for Central England, Fondazione Cineteca di Bologna and Janus Films.

Narinder Singh, acclaimed sound recordist who worked on films like Mani Kaul’s avant-garde feature 'Uski Roti' (1969), Kumar Shahani’s debut 'Maya Darpan' (1972), was the Chief Guest for the closing ceremony to hand over the FIAF certificates to the participants. 

The 7th edition was an advanced course that was open to applicants from India, Sri Lanka, Nepal, Bhutan, Bangladesh and for the first time, the Middle East. As usual, scholarships from the Tata Trusts and FIAF were available for deserving candidates. The workshop had 34 participants with 27 from India, 3 from Sri Lanka, 1 from Nepal, 1 from Saudi Arabia and 2 from Turkey.

References 

Film preservation organizations
2014 establishments in Maharashtra
Organizations established in 2014
Film archives in India
Film organisations in India
Organisations based in Mumbai